James Robert Atkinson, MA, FInstP, FRSE, FRMetS (17 February 1916 – 9 May 2008) was a British physicist.

Career 
On graduating from St John's College, Cambridge in 1938 he took a research post at the Air Ministry Research Establishment in Bawdsey Manor where he carried out research into ‘afterglow’ Cathode Ray Tubes, later taking on a special assignment to upgrade the Chain Home radar stations.

In 1940 he joined the Telecommunications Research Establishment (TRE) where he worked on research into 10 cm, 3 cm and 1 cm wave radar later going on to work on research into super-refraction phenomena and infra red detectors for scope guided missile weapons.

After the war he joined Glasgow University’s Natural Philosophy department under Professor Philip Dee and between 1945 and 1958 he worked on expansion, diffusion and bubble chambers investigating nuclear photodisintegration by gamma rays.

In 1958 he took up a post at UKAEA Dounreay where he took charge of the testing reactor.
Moving on in 1966 he became Assistant Director at the British Ship Research Association working on research into ship architecture, vibration and noise.

In 1976 he joined the Institute of Offshore Engineering at Heriot-Watt University, Edinburgh where he pursued research into wave energy before retiring in 1979.

References

External links
Bawdsey Manor
Bawdsey Radar Group
Penley Radar Archives
Purbeck Radar
The Heritage of Particle Physics in Glasgow
The Herald Obituary
Times Online Obituary

Bibliography
J R Atkinson et al. 1938  The accuracy of rectifier-photoelectric cells, Proceedings of the. Physics. Society Vol. 50 No.6 p. 934-946
J R Atkinson & A f Howartson 1951 Nuclear Scattering of Electrons and Positrons in Argon, Philosophical Magazine 42, p. 1136-45 (October 1951)
J R Atkinson 1955 Condensation Nuclei by U.V. Light, Geofisica pura e applicata 31, p. 54
J R Atkinson & A J Barnard 1952 The Diffusion Cloud Chamber, Nature 169, p. 170 - 173 (2 February 1952)
J R Atkinson et al. 1956  The Photodisintegration of Nitrogen, Proceedings of the. Physics. Society Vol.A 69 No.2 p. 77-92
J R Atkinson 1958 Education in the Atom Age III: Stepping Up the Output of Scientists and Technologists, The Scottish Educational Journal Vol. 41 p. 13-17 (3 January 1958)
J R Atkinson et al. 1960  Scattering of Electrons and Positrons by Xenon and Mercury, Proceedings of the. Physics. Society Vol.75 No.3 p. 447-449
J R Atkinson 1972  An Integrated Approach to Design and Production, Philosophical Transactions of the Royal Society of London. Series A, Mathematical and Physical Sciences Vol. 273 p. 99-118

1916 births
2008 deaths
English physicists
Radar pioneers
Fellows of the Royal Society of Edinburgh
Alumni of St John's College, Cambridge
People from Malvern, Worcestershire
Academics of the University of Glasgow